Isomalathion is an impurity found in some batches of malathion. Whereas the structure of malation is, generically, RSP(S)(OCH3)2, the connectivity of isomalathion is RSPO(SCH3)(OCH3).  It arises by heating malathion. Being significantly more toxic to humans than malathion, it has resulted in human poisonings.

In 1976, numerous malaria workers in Pakistan were poisoned by isomalathion. It is an inhibitor of carboxyesterase.

References

Phosphorodithioates
Succinate esters